Markweta (Markweeta) is a Kalenjin language of Kenya. The regional terms Endo and Sambirir (or the clan name Talai) have been used for northern and southern Markweta, but they are not distinct dialects. The unmarked word order is Verb–subject–object.

Phonology

Vowels 
Markweta has five basic vowels: /a, e, i, o, u/. All vowels have variants based on tongue root position and length, for a total of 20 distinct vowel phonemes.

The vowels /o:/ and /a:/ are both pronounced like /ɔ:/, and can only be distinguished by looking at affixes.

Consonants 
Markweta has 13 consonants:

Morphology 
Markweta has gender. Gender is realized as a prefix added primarily for person nouns and animal names, but sometimes inanimate objects.

The prefixes 'kaa-' and 'kii-' are used to indicate nominalization.

References

Kalenjin languages